Severus Snape and the Marauders is a 2016 American short film written by director Justin Zagri, based on Harry Potter characters by J. K. Rowling. It officially premiered on March 1, 2016, at the YouTube channel Broad Strokes Productions. The fan film caught the attention of BuzzFeed, Entertainment Weekly, Time, Elite Daily, Business Insider, The Huffington Post,
IGN,
Seventeen, Moviepilot, MTV, BBC America, PopSugar, The Independent, and The Mary Sue.

Plot
Severus Snape is enjoying a drink in a Muggle pub when a stranger, whose face is covered, joins him. The stranger asks Snape about his story, which he then tells.

Some time before, the Marauders – James Potter, Remus Lupin, Sirius Black and Peter Pettigrew – were in the same bar celebrating their graduation from Hogwarts. Upon seeing Snape, James challenges him to a duel. Before they all disapparate elsewhere, Lily Evans sees them.

They appear in a forest at night, and James and Snape start dueling. However, Snape eventually becomes victorious, so Remus, Sirius, and (pressured by James) Peter join the fight, and they all produce the Fiendfyre spell, creating a big, four headed fire monster, with each head being their animal form. Snape disapparates to elsewhere in the forest, and Remus, Sirius and James do too, while Peter joins them on foot.

Using Legilimency, Snape predicts their next attack. However, the Marauders attack him at the same time, eventually having him cornered. Snape, remembering their bullying throughout the years, and Lily, rebounds the spells, applies the Cruciatus Curse to Sirius, and Sectumsempra to Remus. Snape attempts to curse Peter, but he takes on his rat form and escapes. Snape approaches James and attempts to kill him, but Lily apparates before him, demanding an explanation. Snape apologizes for calling her a Mudblood (seen in a flashback in Harry Potter and the Order of the Phoenix). Lily tells Snape that she will forgive him if he changes and stops being with Dark wizards, such as Bellatrix Lestrange. Lily disapparates with James, Remus, and Sirius.

Returning to the first scene at the pub, the stranger tells Snape that he knows how it feels to be subjugated and feared for one's talents. He then asks Snape to join his ranks. Snape demands to know who the stranger is. The stranger replies, "You-Know-Who."

Cast 

 Morgana Ignis as Severus Snape
 Garrett Schweighauser as James Potter
 Kevin Allen as Sirius Black
 Paul Stanko as Remus Lupin
 Zachary David as Peter Pettigrew
 Dani Jae as Lily Evans
 Clayton Nemrow as Voldemort

The Great Wizarding War 
After the success of the fan film, the Broad Strokes team starting working on a follow-up to Severus Snape and the Marauders, a 12-part audio drama called The Great Wizarding War written by Justin Zagri. The audio adventure started in late 2019 with the same actors reprised their roles as the Marauders, Lily and Snape. The Great Wizarding War started the adventure just after the events of the fan film, and chronicles early days of the first war between the Order of the Phoenix and the Death Eaters. The final episodes were uploaded to YouTube on March 2, 2022.

References

External links

 
 

2016 fantasy films
2010s thriller films
2016 films
American dark fantasy films
Fan films
Italian fantasy films
Films based on British novels
Films based on children's books
Films based on fantasy novels
Films set in England
Films set in Scotland
Films set in the 1970s
Harry Potter fandom
American independent films
Italian thriller films
Films about magic
2010s teen fantasy films
Films about witchcraft
Films about wizards
Works based on Harry Potter
2010s English-language films
2010s American films
Films released on YouTube